The 2021–22 Campeonato de Portugal was the ninth season of Portuguese football's recreated fourth-tier league, since the merging of the Segunda Divisão and Terceira Divisão in 2013, and the seventh season under the current Campeonato de Portugal title. After the creation of Liga 3, the new third-tier league in 2021, this was also the first season of Campeonato Portugal as the fourth-tier league in Portuguese football league system, the 24th overall at that level. This edition was contested by 61 clubs.

Format
After the transition season of 2020–21, due to COVID effects and creation of Liga 3, the number of participating teams was reduced from 96 to 63. After two teams withdrew before the draw, the competition has 61 teams.

The new competition format consists of three stages. In the first stage, the 61 clubs were divided in five series of 10 teams and one series of 11 teams, according to geographic criteria, with a maximum of two reserve teams in each series. In each series, teams played against each other in a home-and-away double round-robin system.

In the second stage, the two best-placed teams of each of six series advanced to the promotion series, while the remaining teams disputed the relegation series. In the promotion series, the 12 teams were divided in two series of 6 teams, according to geographic criteria. The two best-placed teams of each series were promoted to Liga 3. In the third stage, each winner of promotion series facef each other on a neutral venue to decide the champion.

In the relegation series, the 49 teams were divided in eleven series of 4 teams and one series of 5 teams, with the series with 5 teams having the teams located further north. In each series, teams played against each other in a home-and-away double round-robin system. The two best-placed teams of each series, a total of 24 teams, secured a spot in 2022–23 Campeonato de Portugal. All the remaining teams were relegated to the District Championships.

Teams

Teams from 2020–21 Campeonato de Portugal:

From Serie A:
 Merelinense
 Mirandela
 Maria da Fonte
 Vianense
 Länk Vilaverdense
 Pedras Salgadas

From Serie B:
 São Martinho
 Berço
 Tirsense
 Camacha

From Serie C:
 Leça
 Gondomar
 Marítimo B
 Amarante
 Salgueiros
 Paredes
 Vila Real
 União da Madeira
 Câmara de Lobos

From Serie D:
 Castro Daire
 Valadares
 Espinho

From Serie E:
 Benfica Castelo Branco
 Condeixa
 Marinhense
 Oleiros
 Sertanense
 Vitória de Sernache

From Serie F:
 Loures
 Sintrense
 Sacavenense
 Pêro Pinheiro

From Serie G:
 Praiense
 Fontinhas
 Rabo de Peixe
 Sp. Ideal

From Serie H:
 Olhanense
 Louletano
 Moncarapachense
 Pinhalnovense
 Juventude de Évora
 Esperança de Lagos

Promoted from 2021 to 2022 District Championships:

 Algarve FA: Imortal
 Aveiro FA: Alvarenga
 Azores Champ.: Operário
 Beja FA: Serpa
 Braga FA: Forjães
 Bragança FA: Macedo de Cavaleiros
 Castelo Branco FA: Idanhense
 Coimbra FA: União de Coimbra
 Évora FA: União Montemor
 Guarda FA: Trancoso Gouveia
 Leiria FA: Peniche
 Lisboa FA: Belenenses
 Madeira FA: none
 Portalegre FA: Elvas
 Porto FA: Vila Meã
 Santarém FA: Coruchense
 Setúbal FA: Barreirense
 Viana do Castelo FA: Limianos
 Vila Real FA: Santa Marta de Penaguião
 Viseu FA: Ferreira de Aves

Notes

First stage

The first stage schedule was drawn on 23 July 2021 and was played from 29 August 2021 to 6 March 2022.

Serie A

Serie B

Serie C

Serie D

Serie E

Serie F

Second stage

Promotion

North zone

South zone

Relegation

Serie A

Serie B

Serie C

Serie D

Serie E

Série F

Serie G

Serie H

Serie I

Serie J

Série K

Serie L

Third stage

Championship final

References

Campeonato Nacional de Seniores seasons
4
Por